Mustamäe Ski Jumping Hill is a ski jumping hill in Mustamäe, Tallinn, Estonia.

The first facility was constructed in 1935, it was K12. Later, the facility was changed to K30. During WWII, the facility fell apart.

In 1962, a new facility was built with K50. The facility was designed by Peet Samarütel.

The hill record (59 m, 13 March 2010) belongs to Kristjan Ilves.

References

Buildings and structures in Tallinn
Sports venues in Tallinn
Ski jumping venues